libevent is a software library that provides asynchronous event notification. The libevent API provides a mechanism to execute a callback function when a specific event occurs on a file descriptor or after a timeout has been reached. libevent also supports callbacks triggered by signals and regular timeouts.

libevent is meant to replace the event loop found in event-driven network servers. An application can just call event_dispatch() and then add or remove events dynamically without having to change the event loop.

Currently, libevent supports /dev/poll, kqueue(2), POSIX select(2), Windows IOCP, poll(2), epoll(7) and Solaris event ports. It also has experimental support for real-time signals. The exposed event API  is uniform over all of the supported platforms. As a result, libevent allows for portable application development and provides "the most scalable event notification mechanism available on an operating system".

Using callbacks on signals, libevent makes it possible to write "secure" signal handlers as none of the user supplied signal handling code runs in the signal's context.

libevent was created by Niels Provos and is maintained primarily by Azat Khuzhin. It is released under a BSD license.

Notable applications 

Some of the notable applications that take advantage of libevent are:
Google Chrome: Google's web browser (Mac and Linux versions)
Memcached: a high-performance, distributed memory object caching system
Transmission: an open-source BitTorrent client
 ntpd: the Network Time Protocol daemon
 Tor: an anonymous Internet communication system
 tmux: a terminal multiplexer

Alternatives 
 libev
 libuv
 FAM
 Boost Asio

Major version releases
libevent 2.1 was released on April 3, 2012.
libevent 2.0 was released on April 17, 2009.
libevent 1.4 was released on November 11, 2007.
libevent 1.3 was released on February 15, 2007.
libevent 1.2 was released on October 15, 2006.
libevent 1.1 was released on May 14, 2005.

References

External links

 Libevent web page
 Libevent github repository
 Libevent 2.0 book
 Dan Kegel's "The C10K problem" web page
 A benchmark by the libev author comparing libevent with libev, a similar library

C (programming language) libraries
Events (computing)
Free computer libraries
Software using the BSD license